APEC Chile 2019 would have been an Asia-Pacific Economic Cooperation (APEC) series of meetings in Chile. The meetings were supposed to take place in Santiago and focus on the digital economy, regional connectivity, and women's role in economic growth.

Chile previously hosted an APEC meeting in 2004. The 2019 summit was cancelled on 30 October due to ongoing protests.

Events

Attendees
This would have been the first APEC meeting for Peruvian President Martín Vizcarra, Vietnamese President Nguyễn Phú Trọng, Mexican President Andrés Manuel López Obrador and Papua New Guinean Prime Minister James Marape after their inaugurations and appointments on March 23, 2018, October 23, 2018, December 1, 2018, and May 30, 2019, respectively.

The only leader not in attendance would have been Russian President Vladimir Putin, who cited domestic priorities. Putin was planned to be represented by former Russian President, then-Prime Minister Dmitry Medvedev.

References

External links
 

2019 in economics
Economy of Chile
Diplomatic conferences in Chile
21st-century diplomatic conferences (Asia-Pacific)
2019 in international relations
2019 conferences
2019
2019 in Chile
Cancelled events